Under the Covers: Essential Red Hot Chili Peppers is a compilation album released on March 31, 1998, by the Red Hot Chili Peppers. All of the songs featured are covers mainly from the band's early albums.

The album actually contains 13 tracks even though only ten are listed on the album's back cover. The album was a limited edition release.

Track listing
"They're Red Hot" (Originally by Robert Johnson)  
"Fire" (originally by The Jimi Hendrix Experience)
"Subterranean Homesick Blues" (originally by Bob Dylan)
"Higher Ground" (originally by Stevie Wonder)
"If You Want Me to Stay" (originally by Sly and the Family Stone)
"Why Don't You Love Me" (originally by Hank Williams)
"Tiny Dancer" (Live) (originally by Elton John)
"Castles Made of Sand" (Live) (originally by The Jimi Hendrix Experience)
"Dr. Funkenstein" (Live) (originally by Parliament)
"Hollywood (Africa)" (originally by The Meters)
"Search and Destroy" (originally by Iggy Pop and The Stooges)
"Higher Ground" (Daddy-O Mix)
"Hollywood (Africa)" (Extended Dance Mix)

Sources
'They're Red Hot' – Taken from Blood Sugar Sex Magik
'Fire' Taken from Mother's Milk
'Subterranean Homesick Blues' Taken from The Uplift Mofo Party Plan
'Higher Ground' from Taken from Mother's Milk
'If You Want Me To Stay' Taken from Freaky Styley
'Why Don't You Love Me' Taken from The Red Hot Chili Peppers
'Tiny Dancer (Live)' Previously Unreleased – Recorded Megaland, Landgraaf, Netherlands. 06/04/1990
'Castles Made Of Sand (Live)' Taken from Out In L.A.
'Dr. Funkenstein (Live)' Previously Unreleased – Recorded Cleveland, Ohio 11/17/1989
'Hollywood (Africa)' Taken from Freaky Styley
'Search And Destroy' Originally on Give It Away Single
'Higher Ground (Daddy-O Mix)' Taken from Out In L.A.
'Hollywood (Africa) (Extended Dance Mix)' Taken from Out In L.A.

Personnel 

 Evren Göknar - Mastering Engineer

References

Covers albums
Red Hot Chili Peppers compilation albums
1998 compilation albums
Capitol Records compilation albums
EMI Records compilation albums